Actihema fibigeri is a species of moth of the family Tortricidae. It is found in Uganda. The habitat consists of the edges of mountainous rainforests.

The wingspan is about 14 mm. The forewings are white, suffused with ochreous. The hindwings are light grey with a brownish tinge.

Etymology
The species is named after Michael Fibiger.

References

Endemic fauna of Uganda
Moths described in 2010
Cochylini
Moths of Africa